The 1914 Sewanee Tigers football team represented the Sewanee Tigers of Sewanee: The University of the South during the 1914 Southern Intercollegiate Athletic Association football season.

Before the season
Coach Harris Cope was assisted by several former Sewanee greats, such as Henry D. Phillips and Frank Juhan and Silas Williams and George Watkins.

Schedule

Game summaries

Cumberland
Lee Tolley was a part of the longest kick return in school history, a 90-yard run against Cumberland.

Georgia
All-American David Paddock and Georgia defeated Sewanee 7–6.

Chattanooga
Chattanooga was beaten 46–3.

Florida

Sources:

The Tigers shutout Florida 26–0. Florida was outplayed in the first half. In the final period,  Tolley had an 85-yard touchdown run.

Georgia Tech
John Heisman's Georgia Tech team beat Sewanee 20–0.

Alabama
Alabama was defeated 18–0. Tolley was a part of the first triple-pass in Sewanee history.

Tennessee
An account of the Tennessee game reads "Lindsay, as usual, ploughed through the opposing line for consistent gains, and when it was absolutely necessary that Tennessee gain a certain number of yards 'Russ' was sure to be called upon...Mush Kerr played a wonderful game in the line as did Capt. Kelly. The work of the Tennessee line was easily the feature of the contest, and Sewanee early discovered that it was practically useless to rely on line plunges to gain ground."

Vanderbilt
Sewanee beat rival Vanderbilt for the first time since the championship year of 1909, 14–13. Tolley had a 75-yard touchdown run, and was awarded with a gold fob for the victory. One account reads "For brilliance and beauty of execution, (Tolley's play) has had few equals, if any, in the South, and the Tiger leader retires from the game as the premier quarterback in the S.I.A.A., beyond a doubt." His performance included a 75-yard punt return for a touchdown.

References

Sewanee
Sewanee Tigers football seasons
Sewanee Tigers football